Arthur Brown is a former association football player who represented New Zealand at international level.

Brown made a solitary official international appearance for New Zealand as a substitute in a 0–1 loss to United Arab Emirates on 10 September 1981.

References

External links

Year of birth missing (living people)
Living people
New Zealand association footballers
New Zealand international footballers
20th-century births
Association football forwards